The Anglo-Français de Petite Vénerie is a medium-sized breed of dog used in hunting as a scenthound, usually in packs. It is one of the Anglo-French hound breeds which were created by crossing French scenthounds with English foxhounds. The name Petite Vénerie does not mean that dogs of the breed are petite or small, but rather that it is used to hunt small game.

History and use 
The Anglo-Français de Petite Vénerie was created from crosses of older Anglo-French hounds with Harrier (Beagle) and Poitevin, and also with the Petit Gascon-Saintongeois and the Petit bleu de Gascogne. The French hunting hounds have a very long history, with named local types being recorded in the 16th century. Unlike the larger hounds, the Anglo-Français de Petite Vénerie was not intended for hunting large game. It was primarily used in the Chasse-à-Tir, where the pack (or sometimes an individual dog) circles the game animal and chases it back towards the waiting hunter. Before 1978 the breed was called the Petit Anglo-Français, as it is the smallest of the Anglo-French hounds.

The breed is recognised in its country of origin by the Société Centrale Canine (French Kennel Club) and internationally in 1983 by the Fédération Cynologique Internationale in Group 6, Scenthounds. In France it is bred and kept primarily as a hunting dog, not as a pet or showdog. The breed has been exported to North America, where it is recognised by the United Kennel Club in its Scenthound Group. It is also registered by numerous minor registries and internet dog registry businesses, and is promoted as a rare breed for those seeking a unique pet.
In Italy the breed has been used to hunt wild boar in the mountains of Liguria, giving a good account of itself.

Health and temperament 
Because these are active hunting dogs that are normally kept in packs in rural areas, they may not be suitable for city or family living. No documented health problems, but the drop ears should be checked regularly, as the "warm moist environment under the drooping ear flap is perfect for fungal or bacterial growth."

Similar names and related breeds 
The name Anglo-Francais de Moyen Vénerie is sometimes seen in North America, although no such breed is listed with the French Kennel Club or with the Fédération Cynologique Internationale. It is listed with various minor kennel clubs in the United States, possibly through misunderstanding that the name Petite Vénerie refers to small game, not a small dog and, when the American clubs noticed that the Petite Vénerie was a medium- to large-sized dog, renamed it Moyen Vénerie.

Medium- to large-sized (moyen) French hounds include the Ariegeois, Beagle-Harrier, Chien d'Artois, Porcelaine, Petit Bleu de Gascogne, Petit Gascon Saintongeois, and the rough-coated Briquet Griffon Vendéen, Griffon Bleu de Gascogne, Griffon Fauve de Bretagne, and Griffon Nivernais.

Large French hounds used for hunting "medium-sized" and large game include the Billy, Chien Français Tricolore, Chien Français Blanc et Noir, Chien Français Blanc et Orange, Grand Anglo-Français Tricolore, Grand Anglo-Français Blanc et Noir, Grand Anglo-Français Blanc et Orange, Grand Bleu de Gascogne, Grand Gascon Saintongeois, Grand Griffon Vendéen, and Poitevin.

See also
 Dogs portal
 List of dog breeds
 Dog terminology
 Hunting dog
 Anglo-French hounds

References

External links 

 standard 325, Section 1.2 Scenthound Group of the Fédération Cynologique Internationale

 DMOZ links to clubs and information about the Anglo-Français de Petite Vénerie 

 Anglo Francais in Italy
 splendid specimen of Petit Anglo Francais

FCI breeds
Dog breeds originating in France
Scent hounds